Brett MacLean (born December 24, 1988) is a former Canadian professional ice hockey player who played for the Phoenix Coyotes and Winnipeg Jets in the National Hockey League. He was drafted 32nd overall by the Coyotes in the 2007 NHL Entry Draft. He is currently an assistant coach with the University of Waterloo men's hockey team.

Playing career
MacLean grew up in the small town of Port Elgin, Ontario playing minor hockey for his hometown Port Elgin  and the Grey-Bruce Highlanders AAA of the OMHA.  After leading his Highlanders to an OHL Cup Semi-Final appearance in 2004, MacLean was drafted in the 1st round (11th overall) of the 2004 OHL Draft by the Erie Otters.

MacLean was drafted 32nd overall, in the 2nd round of the 2007 NHL Entry Draft by the Phoenix Coyotes. Brett was drafted from the Ontario Hockey League, where he played with the Erie Otters and the Oshawa Generals.

On 28 April 2008 he was signed by the Phoenix Coyotes to a two-way deal with the San Antonio Rampage which was then the Coyotes' AHL affiliate.

On December 29, 2010, Maclean was called up to the NHL by the Phoenix Coyotes, and scored a goal in his first NHL period against Jonathan Quick of the Los Angeles Kings later that night.

On October 5, 2011, Maclean was placed on waivers by the Phoenix Coyotes, and was claimed by the Winnipeg Jets. On October 28, 2011, MacLean was again waived, and reclaimed by the Coyotes; he was then assigned to the Coyotes' new AHL affiliate team, the Portland Pirates.

Heart condition
On July 2, 2012, MacLean suffered a cardiac emergency while playing hockey with friends in Owen Sound, Ontario.  He was revived using cardiopulmonary resuscitation and a defibrillator.  He subsequently had a defibrillator implanted and was forced to retire from hockey. MacLean is actively campaigning for CPR awareness with the Heart and Stroke Foundation.

Career statistics

Awards and honours

References

External links

1988 births
Living people
Erie Otters players
Ice hockey people from Ontario
Oshawa Generals players
Sportspeople from London, Ontario
Arizona Coyotes draft picks
Phoenix Coyotes players
Portland Pirates players
San Antonio Rampage players
Winnipeg Jets players
Canadian ice hockey left wingers